Mioarele is a commune in Argeș County, Muntenia, Romania. It is composed of five villages: Aluniș, Chilii, Cocenești, Mățău (the commune center) and Suslănești.

References

Communes in Argeș County
Localities in Muntenia